A New Leaf: The End of Cannabis Prohibition is a non-fiction book about cannabis by investigative journalists Alyson Martin and Nushin Rashidian, published by The New Press in 2014.

See also
 List of books about cannabis

References

External links

 
 

2014 non-fiction books
Non-fiction books about cannabis
The New Press books